Donald Louis Corbin (March 28, 1938 – December 12, 2016) was an American judge and politician.

Born in Hot Springs, Arkansas, Corbin moved to San Diego, California with his parents when his father joined the United States Navy. They then moved back to Arkansas and settled in Lewisville, Arkansas and then Texarkana, Arkansas. Corbin served in the United States Marine Corps in 1959. He then received his bachelor's and law degrees from University of Arkansas. He practiced law in Lewisville, Arkansas. From 1971 to 1981, Corbin served in the Arkansas House of Representatives and was a Democrat. He then served in the Arkansas Court of Appeals from 1991 to 2001. Corbin then served as a justice of the Arkansas Supreme Court and was appointed to the position in 2005. He retired at the end of his term in 2014 after suffering a heart attack in 2010 and having a cancerous tumor removed from one of his lungs in 2011. He died on December 12, 2016, from lung cancer.

References

External links
 BallotPedia:Donald Corbin
 http://votesmart.org/candidate/biography/58812/donald-corbin#.VBImlSwtCUk

1938 births
2016 deaths
Politicians from Hot Springs, Arkansas
Military personnel from Arkansas
University of Arkansas alumni
Democratic Party members of the Arkansas House of Representatives
Justices of the Arkansas Supreme Court
Deaths from lung cancer
20th-century American judges
Deaths from cancer in Arkansas
United States Marines